Duncan Keith (born July 16, 1983) is a Canadian former professional ice hockey defenceman who played 17 seasons in the National Hockey League for the Chicago Blackhawks and Edmonton Oilers. He won three Stanley Cup championships with Chicago in 2010, 2013 and 2015. In 2017, Keith was named one of the "100 Greatest NHL Players" in history.

Following his freshman year at Michigan State University, Keith was selected in the second round, 54th overall, by Chicago in the 2002 NHL Entry Draft. After splitting the next year between Michigan State and the Kelowna Rockets of the Western Hockey League (WHL), he spent two seasons with the Norfolk Admirals of the American Hockey League (AHL). In 2005–06, he played his NHL rookie season with the Blackhawks. Four years later, he won the James Norris Memorial Trophy as the NHL's best defenceman. He won a second Norris in 2014 and received the Conn Smythe Trophy as the most valuable player of the 2015 Stanley Cup playoffs by a unanimous vote.

Keith was known as a two-way defenceman, capable in both shutdown and offensive roles. He is a two-time gold medallist in international competition, having appeared with Team Canada at the 2010 Vancouver and 2014 Sochi Winter Olympics.

Early life
Keith is the middle child of Dave and Jean Keith; older brother Cameron (born in 1981) and younger sister Rebecca (born in 1984). His father was in Winnipeg working at the local Canadian Imperial Bank of Commerce (CIBC) branch when he transferred to Fort Frances, Ontario, in 1985 for an assistant manager position. Keith's mother worked in the health field at Rainycrest Home for the Aged in Fort Frances.

Keith grew up as a Boston Bruins fan, singling-out defenceman Ray Bourque and forward Cam Neely as his favourite players, as well as Wayne Gretzky. Keith played minor hockey in the Fort Frances Minor Hockey Association along with his brother. Initially beginning as a forward with the Fort Frances Times Tigers, he has recalled switching to defence at the age of eight or nine. He went on to play AA Atom with Pinewood Sports and Marine Ltd and PeeWee with the Knights of Columbus. After Keith established himself in the NHL, the town of Fort Frances recognized his success by declaring July 21, 2008, "Duncan Keith Day."

While Keith began to be recruited for AAA Bantam in Thunder Bay, Ontario, his father obtained a managerial position at a CIBC branch in Summerland, British Columbia. At age 15, his family moved to nearby Penticton, where he finished his last two years of minor hockey.  He then earned a spot on the local Junior A team, the Penticton Panthers of the British Columbia Hockey League (BCHL), as a 16-year-old.

Playing career

Junior/collegiate
Keith played three years for the Penticton Panthers from 1999–00 through 2000–01, scoring 78 goals and 148 assists for 226 points in 163 games. He was recruited by Michigan State University and played college hockey there for two years with the Michigan State Spartans of the Central Collegiate Hockey Association (CCHA). He scored a goal in his Spartans debut in the Cold War, an outdoor game at Spartan Stadium against the state-rival University of Michigan Wolverines on October 6, 2001, the game set a record for attendance at their hockey games. He completed his freshman year with 3 goals and 15 points in 41 games, ranked fourth among team defencemen behind John-Michael Liles, Brad Fast and Andrew Hutchinson. During Keith's second college season, he left the Spartans after 15 games to join the major junior ranks. He returned to British Columbia to play for the Kelowna Rockets of the Western Hockey League (WHL) and amassed 46 points (11 goals and 35 assists) over 37 regular season games with a +32 plus-minus in his single season there. He also added 14 points in 19 playoff games.

Professional

Chicago Blackhawks (2005–2021)
Keith was selected by the Chicago Blackhawks in the second round, 54th overall, of the 2002 NHL Entry Draft. He signed with Chicago prior to the 2003–04 season and spent his first two seasons after junior in the American Hockey League (AHL) with the team affiliate Norfolk Admirals. He recorded seven goals and 25 points over 75 games in his professional rookie season in 2003–04. Keith's chances of earning a spot with the Blackhawks the following season were eliminated due to the 2004–05 NHL lock-out. Remaining with the Admirals, he continued his pace with 26 points in 79 games.

Following two seasons in the AHL, Keith made the Blackhawks squad out of the 2005 training camp. He played in his first NHL game on October 5, 2005, against the Mighty Ducks of Anaheim. He made an immediate impact on the club, scoring 9 goals and 21 points, while averaging over 23 minutes of ice time in 81 games during his 2005–06 NHL rookie season. The Blackhawks re-signed him in the off-season to a four-year contract extension.

In 2006–07, he played in all 82 games for the Blackhawks and once again led the team in average ice time at 23 minutes. He had 2 goals and 31 points while leading the team in blocked shots with 148. For the 2007–08 season, Keith saw even more ice time as injuries wracked the Blackhawks' defensive corps. He began the season on the top-defensive pairing with Brent Seabrook. By mid-January, he was averaging 24:31 minutes of ice time and had a team leading plus-minus of +14. He was rewarded for this effort by a selection to his first NHL All-Star Game in 2008. Keith went on to finish the season with 12 goals and 32 points, along with a +30 plus-minus rating, despite being on a non-playoff team.

On October 8, 2008, Keith was named an alternate captain along with forward Patrick Sharp to the start the 2008–09 season. He helped a rejuvenated Blackhawks team, led by second-year forwards Jonathan Toews and Patrick Kane, back into the Stanley Cup playoffs, recording 8 goals and 44 points, second among team defencemen to Brian Campbell. He added 6 points in 17 playoff games as the Blackhawks advanced to the Western Conference Finals, where they were eliminated by Central Division rivals, the Detroit Red Wings.

With Keith having established himself with Seabrook as one of the top shutdown pairings in the league, he made significant offensive improvement in 2009–10. On December 3, 2009, the Blackhawks announced having extended Keith's contract simultaneously with Jonathan Toews and Patrick Kane. At $72 million over 13 years, Keith's contract was the most lucrative in team history, surpassing Marián Hossa's 12-year, $62.8 million contract signed several months prior in July 2009. He completed the season with 14 goals and 69 points, ranked second among league defencemen behind Mike Green of the Washington Capitals.  It was also the highest total for a Blackhawks defenceman since Chris Chelios' 72-point season in 1995–96. His 26:35 minutes of average ice time was the second highest in the league. Entering the 2010 playoffs as the second seed in the Western Conference, the Blackhawks eliminated the Nashville Predators, Vancouver Canucks and San Jose Sharks in the first three rounds. During Game 4 of the Western Conference Finals against the Sharks, Keith had seven teeth knocked out by a puck. He returned minutes after the incident to help the Blackhawks complete a four-game sweep of the Sharks and advance to the Stanley Cup Finals for the first time since 1992. Matched against the Philadelphia Flyers, they won the Stanley Cup in six games. Keith finished the post-season with 17 points (2 goals and 15 assists) over 22 contests. Nominated for the James Norris Memorial Trophy for his regular season performance, he outvoted Mike Green and Drew Doughty of the Los Angeles Kings to earn the award as the NHL's best defenceman in the off-season.

As a result of several Blackhawks players, including Keith, entering the first year of lucrative contracts in the 2010–11 season, the team was forced to deal away several components of their Stanley Cup winning team to fit under the salary cap. With a diminished roster, Chicago qualified for the playoffs by two points as the eighth and final seed in the West. Keith's production decreased to 7 goals and 45 points over 82 games. Facing the Canucks in the first round, the Blackhawks were eliminated in seven games. Keith recorded four goals and two assists during the series.

On March 23, 2012, Keith was suspended five games for delivering an elbow to the head of Canuck forward Daniel Sedin. Head of the Department of Player Safety Brendan Shanahan observed that the hit was "dangerous, reckless, and caused injury" in his video release.

On June 4, 2013, Keith received a one-game suspension for a slash to the face of Los Angeles Kings' forward Jeff Carter during Game 3 of the Western Conference Finals. The league, in announcing the suspension, referred to the slash as "a one handed upward swing" which struck Carter directly in the face causing a laceration which required 20 stitches to close.

In the following season, Keith tallied 6 goals and 55 assists while maintaining a +22 plus-minus rating over 79 games. He was with gold-medallist Team Canada at the 2014 Sochi Winter Olympics. Keith recorded four goals and seven assists in the 2014 playoffs, but lost to Los Angeles Kings in the Western Conference Finals, the eventual champions.

After the season's conclusion, Keith was awarded his second Norris Trophy as the NHL's top defenceman.

On June 15, 2015, Keith won his third Stanley Cup with the Blackhawks. His 2015 playoffs performance resulted in the Conn Smythe Trophy for playoffs MVP, after scoring the winning goal on Tampa Bay Lightning goaltender Ben Bishop. He joins Henrik Zetterberg in having achieved scoring the Cup-winning goal and receiving the Conn Smythe Trophy in the same year in 2008.

On March 29, 2016, Keith was checked to the ice by Minnesota Wild forward Charlie Coyle and retaliated with his stick—Coyle required medical attention having blood dripping from his nose. Keith was penalized for intent to injure. A review would lead to his suspension from the last five games of the regular season and the first game of the 2016 playoffs – causing Keith to forfeit $148,883.35 in salary under the terms of the NHL collective bargaining agreement.

On December 11, 2018, Keith and teammate Brent Seabrook became the first pair of defencemen, and the seventh duo in NHL history, to play 1,000 games together.

Edmonton Oilers (2021–2022)
At the end of June 2021, it was reported that Keith had requested a trade from the Blackhawks to Western Canada or the Pacific Northwest of the United States to be closer to his family (who live in Penticton, British Columbia) as he finished out his career. On July 12, Keith's sixteen season run with the Blackhawks came to an end when he, along with Tim Söderlund, were traded to the Edmonton Oilers in exchange for Caleb Jones and a conditional third-round pick in 2022. Keith left the Chicago organisation holding numerous distinctions, including the second most games played in team uniform, second most points by a blueliner (behind only Doug Wilson) and having led the team in ice time for every season he played. Oilers general manager Ken Holland's decision to trade for Keith was controversial, with many faulting the decision to agree to the trade without Chicago retaining any portion of Keith's salary against the salary cap. At the time of the trade, a number of analytical models rated Keith as one of the worst defencemen in the NHL.

Despite the controversy, Keith was generally regarded as having performed solidly in his debut season in Edmonton, recording 1 goal and 20 assists in 64 games played, largely on the second pair. He spent much of the second half of the season partnered with Evan Bouchard, who credited him as a valuable mentor. The Oilers finished the season second in the Pacific Division, advancing into the 2022 Stanley Cup playoffs. The team defeated the Los Angeles Kings and the Calgary Flames in the first two rounds, meeting the Colorado Avalanche in the Western Conference Finals before being defeated in four games.

Following the end of the season, the Oilers reportedly asked Keith to clarify by July 1, 2022 whether he intended to play another season or retire. Keith officially announced his retirement on July 12.

Post-playing career
The Edmonton Oilers hired Keith as a player development consultant on October 14, 2022.

International play

Keith debuted internationally for Canada at the 2008 IIHF World Championship. He contributed two assists in nine games as Canada won a silver medal, losing in the gold medal game to Russia.

On December 30, 2009, Keith was selected to play for Canada at the 2010 Winter Olympics in Vancouver. He was named to the squad along with Blackhawks teammates Brent Seabrook and Jonathan Toews. Although Keith was expected to retain Seabrook as his defensive partner from the NHL to Canada, Seabrook ended up as the designated seventh defenceman while Keith formed a pairing with Drew Doughty. Keith finished the tournament with six assists, leading Canada in ice time, as Canada won the gold medal over the United States 3–2 in overtime on February 28, 2010.  It was Keith's first international gold medal.

Keith also played on Canada's gold medal-winning team at the Ice hockey at the 2014 Winter Olympics – Men's tournament in Sochi.

Personal life
Keith and his ex-wife Kelly-Rae have one son, who was born on May 8, 2013.

On February 25, 2014, Keith, along with Blackhawks teammate Brent Seabrook, made a cameo appearance on the NBC drama Chicago Fire.

Career statistics

Regular season and playoffs
Bold indicates led league

International

Awards

References

External links
 
 Duncan Keith's Official Site

1983 births
Canadian ice hockey defencemen
Chicago Blackhawks draft picks
Chicago Blackhawks players
Edmonton Oilers players
Ice hockey people from Ontario
Ice hockey players at the 2010 Winter Olympics
Ice hockey players at the 2014 Winter Olympics
James Norris Memorial Trophy winners
Conn Smythe Trophy winners
Kelowna Rockets players
Living people
Medalists at the 2010 Winter Olympics
Medalists at the 2014 Winter Olympics
Michigan State Spartans men's ice hockey players
National Hockey League All-Stars
Norfolk Admirals players
Olympic gold medalists for Canada
Olympic ice hockey players of Canada
Olympic medalists in ice hockey
Ice hockey people from Winnipeg
Stanley Cup champions